John David Prior is an Australian musician, composer and producer recognized for his work with Matt Finish, Adrian Belew (King Crimson), Mick Taylor (The Rolling Stones), Roy Buchanan, Champion Jack Dupree, New Theatre, Coca-Cola, The Great Outdoors, Iota, Wicked Beat Sound System, Kevin Borich and Dale Barlow.

Sydney Morning Herald reviewer John Shand wrote: "Prior was a nexus of energy, fun and accuracy" performing with Adrian Belew.

John is the owner and director of Mammal Music Pty Ltd audio/video production company, and Unity Gain Studios, where he has composed and produced albums for many independent artists including the ARIA Award winning Tibetan Prayer (Best World/Traditional/Folk Album 1995), ARIA Award nominated The Hipbone Connection (Best Independent Album 2000 and No. 1 on the Australian Independent Record Labels Association (AIR) charts) and ARIA Award nominated The Story of Abbey (Best Show/Cast Album 2002).

He has also produced a number of works for film, television, theatre and advertising, gaining an Australian Guild of Screen Composers Nomination for orchestral composition and production.

Musical history

The 1970s
Prior started playing guitar aged 8, drums at 11, vibraphone at 17 and piano at 24. During his teens, he performed in the bands Mandrake and Legend with brother Rob Prior (guitar/vocals) and neighbor Paul Williams (bass guitar) at the Mosman Spastic Centre, The Kirribilli Hotel, and his school, Sydney Boys High School. With the addition of keyboards player Chris Short and the name change to Conic Section, they composed original jazz-rock fusion, performed at the Limerick Castle Hotel and won the Festival Of Pop band competition at Flemington Sydney in 1974 and a 2SM song competition in 1975. The band TAPP, comprising John and Rob Prior, Peter Astley (bass guitar), Geoff Taylor (keyboards) and Peter Noakes (vocals) recorded at Wirra Willa Studios, Glenfield.

At 16, he played drums with Stevie Wright (Easybeats), Sea of Clouds, Atlantis, the Northbridge Jazz Band and formed experimental funk band Hot Dogma with Craig Learmont (guitar, The Layabouts, Klezma Orcheztra), Peter Astley (bass), Anthony Smith (keyboards, Flowers, Icehouse) and Peter Noakes (vocals).

In 1979, Prior formed Matt Finish with singer/guitarist Matt Moffitt and through to the end of the seventies, they played regular residencies in clubs and pubs around Sydney every night of the week, often double-gigging on weekends. In November 1979, a few months after forming, radio station 2JJ broadcast Matt Finish live-to-air from the Civic Hotel in Pitt Street, Sydney and continued to broadcast the raw live performances for a year.

The 1980s
During the eighties, Matt Finish was one of Australia's most popular live bands performing thousands of live shows to millions of people including national tours with U2, XTC, Midnight Oil, INXS, The Ramones, Split Enz, Cold Chisel, Bryan Ferry and The B-52's.

Matt Finish released Matt Finish Play Africa (single 1980), Short Note (album 1981), Fade Away (EP 1981), Matt Finish (EP 1983),  Word of Mouth (album 1983) and numerous singles. The Short Note album was re-released on CD in 1989 and is still available from music shops.

In 1985, Prior travelled to London and Brussels to record the Matt Moffitt solo album By As Little As A Look with producer Nicky Graham (David Bowie, CBS A&R Manager). While in London, he continued studying piano and music theory with Peter Sanders (London Symphony Orchestra) and electronic music using computers, synthesizers and samplers at CBS Studios London and Fairlight CMI's studios in Sydney.

During the late eighties, Prior toured Australia as drummer with Roy Buchanan, Champion Jack Dupree, Mal Eastick, Girl Overboard, Troy Newman, Jackie Orszaczky, Guy Le Claire, Stephanie Howell, Baby Loves To Cha-Cha, Getaway Plane, T-Vibes, Bastiaan, Bob Armstrong and Charlie McMahon; recorded Land Of The Living with Mark Edwards; performed drums with Rob Hirst (Midnight Oil) and hundreds of other drummers and percussionists at Bondi Pavilion; performed solo at the first Australian Music Day Concert; performed each year at the Sydney, Melbourne & Brisbane Music Trade Fairs; conducted drum clinics and music clinics in music shops around Australia sponsored by Australis Music, Tama Drums, Akai Samplers, Dynamic Music and Sabian Cymbals; taught drums at Drum City Sydney and Emmanuel School Randwick; composed music for productions at Sydney's Ensemble Theatre, Nimrod Theatre, Griffin Theatre, New Theatre (Newtown) and Belvoir St Theatre; and produced local independent artists including Megan Williams, One Franc, Sandi Chick, Amanda Mann and Guy Le Claire.

In 1989, Prior travelled to New York to produce Matt Moffitt and Jennifer Barrett and perform with Pacific Orchestra

The 1990s
In 1990, Moffitt and Prior reformed Matt Finish with Matt Moffitt, former Eurogliders members Guy Le Claire (guitar) and Lindsay Jehan (bass), and New Yorker Jennifer Barrett (guitar). Managed and promoted by Prior, the band completed their most successful tour to date including fifty sold-out performances around Australia. The band recorded four songs at Studios 301 and Bondi Road Studios that were released in 2009 on the album Kite on a Hurricane Day.

He also performed live with Olivia Newton-John, Crunch, Monkey Principle, Mick Taylor from the Rolling Stones and Alex Lloyd.

In 1992, he formed Mammal Music production company, incorporated in 1994, and built Unity Gain Studios audio and video production facilities in Erskineville in 1997.

During this period, John composed and produced several production music albums for Bruton Music UK and albums for local independent artists including ARIA Award winner Tibetan Prayer with Yungchen Lhamo featuring Tibetan Monks from Namgyal Monastery (Best World/Traditional/Folk Album 1995) and the ARIA Award nominated The Hipbone Connection with iOTA (Best Independent Album 2000 and No. 1 on the Australian Independent Record Labels Association (AIR) Charts), which spawned 6 charting singles.

He also composed and produced music, dialogue and sound effects for film, television, theater and advertising including soundtracks for MTV, The World Around Us, AFTRS, Australian Federal Government, NSW Tourism, Australia Today Indonesia Tomorrow, Jesus Christ Superstar, feature film This Won't Hurt A Bit, award winning short film The Red Dress, The Great Outdoors, Paradise Beach, Art of Stone, Barnardos, Coca-Cola, McDonald's, KFC, Levi's, Sun Alliance, Sky-Garden, Andronicus, Toyota, Slazenger, Buttercup, Just Jeans, Frutti, Hi-C, Milo, Sydney Turf Club, Deloitte, BA Insurance and Price Waterhouse.

The 2000s
During 2001, Prior traveled to Europe and the US to attend numerous music festivals. Back in Australia, he produced the jazz/fusion album Day And Night with Bob Spencer's band Eclection before forming the experimental electronic project Ear Candy, with jazz saxophonist Dale Barlow, singer Wendy Dorsett and her son Kayci, producing the underground dance hits Made in Australia, Feels Like Summer and Candy For Your Soul.

In 2002, he co-composed, arranged and produced the ARIA Award nominated rock opera The Story of Abbey  (Best Show/Cast Album 2002), which also had a successful theatrical run at the Sydney Seymour Centre, and produced the album The Need To Fall with rock band Merge.

In 2003, he produced Leave Nothing Untouched with dance troupe Astral Taxi and composed 20 albums of commercial library music that appeared in soundtracks around the world.

In 2004, he composed an orchestral score for the Deloitte advertising campaign Out For Glory and formed the world/fusion band Newtown Beats with Eddie Quansah (Osibisa, Bob Marley, King Cobra).

In 2005, he produced jazz vocalist Jennifer Whatson's debut self-titled album and composed an orchestral score for New Theatre's production of the Spike Milligan play Badjelly the Witch, which ran in January 2006 and January 2007.

In 2006, he composed and produced an orchestral score for the short film A Fairytale of the City featuring Sam Worthington, produced recordings with Newtown Beats, Robot Productions, guitarist Bob Spencer and singer Meryl Leppard, performed live with Sydney bands Newtown Beats, The Lovely Sons and Swing Thing; and toured Australia with King Crimson singer/guitarist Adrian Belew and bassist Al Slavik. Their first performance was at Byron Bay Bluesfest (East Coast Blues & Roots Music Festival) for 75,000 people. John and Rob Prior promoted further shows with Adrian at the Basement in Sydney and Manchester Lane in Melbourne.

In November 2006, he produced the Matt Finish single Don't Fade Away with singer/guitarist Luke Dixon, bassist Matt Cornell and sound engineer Greg Clarke; directed, edited and promoted the accompanying video clip; and in December 2006, John and his brother Rob promoted Matt Finish's Matt Moffitt Memorial Tour featuring Dixon, Cornell, Clayton and a guest performance by Rick Grossman.

During 2007, he managed, promoted and performed on a 35-show Matt Finish tour featuring vocalist David Adams, bassist Harry Brus and a number of guest guitarists including Guy Le Claire, Eliot Reynolds, Steve Edmonds, Les Rankin and Kevin Borich and Dale Barlow. While touring, Prior also promoted and performed a number of music clinics and workshops at music stores around Australia in association with sponsors Australis Music, Allans Music, Tama and Sabian cymbals, including a performance at the Sydney Guitar Show featuring Kevin Borich and Steve Edmonds. In December 2007, he produced the Matt Finish album 1978 - 2008, released January 2008.

During 2008, he produced Steve Lockyer's debut Sticks & Stones and David Kingdom's Tattoo, and managed a Matt Finish tour with special guest musicians Dale Barlow and Guy Le Claire, both childhood friends. In December 2008, he directed, edited and produced a video clip for the Matt Finish song Short Note from archival footage.

In January 2009, Prior edited, produced and authored the Matt Finish DVD Live at the Musicians Club 1981 with the only existing concert video of Matt Finish in the eighties. In February 2009, he produced the Matt Finish EP New Frontier featuring singer David Adams and collated and remastered an extensive collection of Matt Finish recordings that were released in December 2009 as the Matt Finish Flight Case, a 12-disc box-set including a book and posters. The band performed more than 30 shows around the country during the year. He also produced the albums The Shaggers with The Shaggers and The Cat, The Fiddle & This Tune with Sameera Bashir.

In 2010, Prior composed, produced and released an album of original Arabic music entitled The Red Sea, produced an album of Russian folk music with Sydney composer and pianist Tatyana, and performed drums live with Matt Finish, Newtown Beats, JFK, The Erskinevillains, Bulli Lama, The Swingers, Ray Husband's band and Mysterious Travellers, a tribute to Weather Report featuring acclaimed jazz musicians Dale Barlow (sax), Bill Risby (piano), Phil Scorgie (bass), Fabian Hevia and David Fester (percussion).

In 2011, he formed the band Stone and the Sky with Swedish vocalist Pontus Duvsjo, which recorded and performed a number of live shows including a benefit concert that raised $50,000 for the Prince of Wales Foundation. He produced the album Nowhere To Hide with vocalist Peter Colleer's band The Unnamed Sources.

In February 2012, he promoted a tour with Matt Finish and a series of performances at the Marrickville Bowling & Recreation Club entitled The Do featuring local soul and groove artists. A percentage of ticket sales was donated to local charity Father Dave's Youth Centre.

During 2012 and 2013, he produced albums at his studio, Unity Gain Studios Erskineville, with Sophie Von, Ray Husband, Love Child, The Inner West, The Ians and Peter Colleer; plus the single Bass Straight with Gordon Trott.

Between 2014 and 2018, Prior produced and played on albums and soundtracks for Farooq Haider, Love Child, Deloitte Australia, Sacred Cow, Heavily Made Up Boy, Shanghaied Project, Warren McLean from Divinyls, Placebo Cure, Magnus, Trevor Rowe, Music Box, Ray Husband, Travis Masters, Samantha Cartwright, Paul Kougias, Eddie Brown, Jacquie McGill, Martin Nickson, The Final Word, Craig Leermont, Mi-Sex guitarist Kevin Stanton and The Good Life. During that time he also performed live with Ray Husband, Matt Finish and Oz Rock Roadshow featuring special guests Mark Gable from Choirboys, Angry Anderson from Rose Tattoo, Steve Mulry from Ted Mulry Gang, Mick Peeling from Stars and Bob Spencer from Skyhooks and The Angels.

Between 2017 and 2020, John taught music and produced student recordings at Dulwich High School of Visual Arts and Design sponsored by Canterbury Hurlstone Park RSL Club; and Matt Finish performed at 'Sunset Sounds', 'Classic Hits' and 'Pure Gold' shows for Empire Touring, featuring other popular Australian artists such as Ian Moss, Eurogliders, The Models, Jon Stevens, Dragon, Radiators, Ross Wilson, Mi-Sex, Real Life, Wendy Matthews and GANGgajang, with sold out shows at Enmore Theatre Sydney, WIN Entertainment Centre Wollongong, Sandstone Point, Wagga Racecourse, Gosford Racecourse, Roche Estate Hunter Valley, and Australia Day Parramatta Park in Sydney with 20,000 people.

Between 2020 and 2022, during the pandemic, John composed and produced theme music for PayPal Brazil, produced albums for independent Australian artists Peter Colleer, Ethelated Spirits, Travis Masters, Sophie Von, Anita Monk, Coast Collective, Seven, Aegean Quartet and Peter Fenwick, and produced and played drums on the song When I See You Dancing by Steve Williams from Wa Wa Nee, Jon Lord and Matt Finish featuring vocalist John Kenny from Rockmelons.

Associations
In 2012, Prior co-formed The Association of Australian Musicians (AM) and The Australian Independent Musicians Association (AIMA), an online forum for Australian musicians managed by AM, with more than 12,000 members in 2022. AM and AIMA members have developed The Australian Music Plan proposing a range of music industry reforms.

In 2014, Prior became a co-founder and active member of the Australian Performing Rights Association (APRA) Resolution Pathways Dispute Resolution Committee, APRA Writer Members Sub-Committee and APRA Peer Review Committee, developing a peer review system for more than 100,000 APRA members to seek advice and resolve disputes, winning the Australian Disputes Centre’s ADR Corporate Team of the Year award in 2016 for innovative dispute resolution. In March 2020, at the start of the pandemic, John resigned from all APRA committees.

Legal Issues
In 1995, Prior won an Expert Determination commissioned by APRA and conducted by Davis Catterns QC regarding authorship of the theme and underscore music for the television series Great Outdoors created in 1992.

In 2000, John won Prior v Sheldon & Artec Sound Vision in the Federal Court regarding authorship of the theme and underscore for Great Outdoors after eight years of dispute.

From 2010 to 2020, no-win-no-fee lawyers sued Prior thrice consecutively regarding property and copyright ownership in the Federal and Supreme Courts of Australia, all of which he won. On 25 March 2019, during the Supreme Court case, John's solicitor and friend Christopher John Boyd died at The Gap in Watson's Bay Sydney. On Friday April 5, 2019, Chris' favourite song Short Note was played at his funeral at St Joan of Arc Church Haberfield.

In 2018, an APRA Peer Review Panel of APRA Writer Members upheld claims by Rick Grossman, Jeff Clayton and Prior regarding authorship of Matt Finish songs.

In 2022 Prior won two disputes at the NSW Civil and Administrative Tribunal (NCAT) regarding equipment sales.

Prior has also won seven District Court cases brought by South Sydney Council regarding parking outside his studio and residence.

A dispute regarding claims by Matt Finish members of copyright infringement of Matt Finish works by Universal Music, Sony Music, Warner Music, Origin Music Publishing, MCA Music, Mushroom Music, APRA and AMCOS continues unresolved. John has spoken about this dispute and the state of the Australian music industry in interviews with ABC News Radio, ABC Drive and numerous community radio stations.

Discography

Matt Finish 
1980 Matt Finish Play Africa: CIA / Mancini Shuffle
1981 Short Note
1981 Short Note / Layman's Day
1981 Fade Away
1983 Matt Finish
1984 Words and Wars / Still Roads (I Need It) / Come on Over
1984 Word of Mouth
1984 Always Another / Forecast
2001 Just a Short Note (The Best of)
2006 Don't Fade Away 2006
2008 1978 – 2008
2009 Matt Finish Live at the Musicians Club 1981
2009 New Frontier
2010 Civic Hotel
2010 Music Farm
2010 Short Note Remastered
2010 Parramatta Park & Melbourne Uni
2010 Fade Away Sessions
2010 Word of Mouth (2CD)
2010 At The Tivoli
2010 Truck Surfing
2010 Kite on a Hurricane Day

Matt Moffitt 
1986 By As Little As A Look
1987 The Key To Camden Lock
1989 In The Mist Of Candlewood Lake

Other Artists
1986 Mark Edwards / Land Of The Living
1987 Johnny Batchelor / Work And Save
1991 Guy Le Claire / Guy Le Claire
1991 Keith Urban / Keith Urban
1993 Wicked Beat Sound System / Summer Sun, Inside, Stand Up
1993 Pam Sethi / Sai Baba
1993 Pam Sethi / Pam Sethi
1994 Great South Land / Great South Land	
1994 Toni Nation / Toni Nation
1995 Young Chen Lhamo / Tibetan Prayer
1996 Heavenly Light Quartet / Heavenly Light Quartet
1997 Guy Le Claire / Naughty
1997 Xiang / Xiang
1997 Bujuanes / This Is Life
1998 Ragged Band / Distant Shores
1998 Pan De Cielo / Bread of Heaven
1998 iOTA / iOTA
1999 Maréa / No Distractions Please
1999 iOTA / The Hip Bone Connection
2000 Merge / Interface
2000 Mr House / The Fruits of Mr House
2001 Eclection / Day And Night
2001 Ear Candy / Made in Australia
2001 Ear Candy / Feels Like Summer	
2001 Ear Candy / Candy For Your Soul
2002 Merge / The Need To Fall
2002 Play Act One / Story of Abbey
2003 Astral Taxi / Leave Nothing Untouched
2005 Jennifer Whatson / Jennifer Whatson
2006 Meryl Leppard / Meryl Leppard
2007 Robot Productions / Robot Productions
2008 Steve Lockyer / Sticks & Stones
2008 David Kingdom / Tattoo
2009 The Shaggers / The Shaggers
2009 Sameera Bashir / The Cat, The Fiddle & This Tune
2010 Love Child / Love Child 1
2010 John Prior / The Red Sea
2011 The Unnamed Sources / Nowhere To Hide
2011 Stone and the Sky / Stone and the Sky
2011 Sophie Von / Sophie Von
2012 Ray Husband / Together Now
2012 Gordon Trott /  Bass Straight
2012 Peter Colleer /  Peter Colleer
2012 Love Child / Love Child 2
2012 Nikki Nichols / Don't Let Them Cry
2012 The Inner West / Fatal Sounds
2013 The Ians / The Ians
2013 Deloitte / Experience (soundtrack)
2013 Redfern All Blacks (training videos)
2013 Heavily Made Up Boy / My Hysteria
2014 Farooq Haider / Dooriyan (video)
2014 Love Child / Circus In Town
2014 Deloitte / Luck (soundtrack)
2014 Sacred Cow / Misery
2014 Heavily Made Up Boy / First World Problems
2014 Sanghaied Project / Shanghaied
2014 Warren McLean / Brass Gongs
2014 Guy Le Claire / Rock Hitz
2014 Farooq Haider / Rang De
2014 Farooq Haider / Azadi
2014 Placebo Cure / Thistle Fixit
2014 Music Box / Muzique
2014 Ray Husband / Together Now
2014 Eddie Brown / Things That Matter
2015 Seven / Live Masters
2015 Jacquie McGill / Will Devine
2015 Magnus / I
2016 The Final Word / Start Again
2016 Skip Tracer / Blistered
2016 Blood Blossoms / Hymns From the Pit
2016 Music Box / Kiss Me Twice
2016 Farooq Haider / Haq Allah
2016 Martin Nickson / Into The Blue
2016 Martin Nickson / Let’s Pretend
2016 Craig Learmont / The Garden Of Earthly Delights
2016 Samantha Cartwright / Edge Of The World
2016 The Final Word / On The Edge Of Nowhere
2017 Paul Kougias / Come Walk With Me
2017 Travis Masters / The Auburn Girl
2017 Good Life / Good Life Theme
2017 The Final Word / Crazy Like This
2020 Anita Monk / Walking In The Park
2021 Steve Williams / When I See You Dancing
2019 Sophie Von / Christmas Album
2019 Dulwich High School Rock Band / Time To Party
2019 Peter Colleer / Best Laid Plans
2020 Ethelated Spirits / I'll Take Care Of You
2020 Sophie Von / World Album
2020 Mr President / I Don't Mind remix
2020 Aegean Quartet / Aegean Quartet
2020 Martin Nickson / Fiesta
2021 Seven / 2021
2021 Equity Lane / Echoes Of The Boom
2022 Peter Colleer /  Better World
2022 Seven / 2022
2022 Peter Fenwick / Know It

Production Music
1995 Bruton Music UK / Impact Promotions
1996 Bruton Music UK / Pop Music
1996 Bruton Music UK / various compilation albums
2003 Unreal Music / Energy
2003 Unreal Music / Smooth
2003 Unreal Music / Pop Roots
2003 Unreal Music / Club Soda
2003 Unreal Music / Master Grooves
2003 Unreal Music / Café Cool
2003 Unreal Music / Extra Chunky
2003 Unreal Music / Guitar Lover
2003 Unreal Music / Retail Melodies
2003 Unreal Music / Neo Classics
2003 Unreal Music / Arabmatic
2003 Unreal Music / Folk & Gypsy
2003 Unreal Music / Atmosphere
2003 Unreal Music / Earth
2003 Unreal Music / Romantic Piano
2003 Unreal Music / Unreal Christmas
2003 Unreal Music / All Sorts
2003 Unreal Music / Survival Kit
2004 Unreal Music / Celestial Grooves
2004 Unreal Music / Astral Riffs
2004 Unreal Music / Urban Dub

References

External links
What's On Central Coast gig and CD reviews by Deb Lalor
Sydney Morning Herald review of Adrian Belew with John Prior
Matt Finish at Nostalgia Central

Living people
Australian drummers
Australian rock drummers
Male drummers
Australian rock keyboardists
Australian male composers
Australian composers
People educated at Sydney Boys High School
Musicians from Sydney
Australian rock guitarists
1960 births
Australian male guitarists